Nice Feelin' is the second album by Rita Coolidge. It was released in 1971. The album was produced by David Anderle, with The Dixie Flyers serving as the studio band.

Track listing

Side one
"Family Full of Soul" (Marc Benno) – 2:56
"You Touched Me in the Morning" (Michael Utley, Steve Bogard) – 3:20
"If You Were Mine" (Jimmy Lewis) – 3:37
"Nice Feelin'" (Marc Benno) – 5:26
"Only You Know and I Know" (Dave Mason) – 3:36

Side two
"I'll Be Here" (Jimmy Lewis) – 4:21
"Better Days" (Graham Nash) – 3:07
"Lay My Burden Down" (Michael Utley, Steve Bogard) – 3:59
"Most Likely You Go Your Way (And I'll Go Mine)" (Bob Dylan) – 4:10
"Journey Through the Past" (Neil Young) – 3:27

Personnel
Rita Coolidge - vocals, piano on "Journey Through the Past"
The Dixie Flyers
Marc Benno –  guitar, vocals
Charlie Freeman – guitar
Michael Utley – keyboards
Tommy McClure – bass
Sammy Creason – drums
Al Kooper – organ on "I'll Be Here" 
Nick DeCaro – accordion on "Journey Through the Past"
Don Brooks – harmonica on "Only You Know and I Know", "Better Days" and "Most Likely You Go Your Way (And I'll Go Mine)"
Rusty Young – steel guitar on "You Touched Me in the Morning" 
Technical
Recording Engineers:  Bruce Botnick at A&M Studios, Glyn Johns & Richard Moore at Wally Heider Studios
Remix Engineer:  Glyn Johns at Island Studios, London.
Special Thanks to Tony Platt at Island Studios
Art Direction:  Roland Young
Inside Cover Photograph:  Ethan A. Russell
Front and Back Cover Photographs:  Bob Jenkins
Lettering:  Wayne Kimball
Direction:  Ronald Stone

Charts

References

Rita Coolidge albums
1971 albums
Albums produced by David Anderle
A&M Records albums
Albums recorded at Wally Heider Studios
Albums recorded at A&M Studios